Schroder may refer to:

Schröder, German surname
Schrøder, Danish surname
, German ship
Restaurant Schrøder

See also
Schroeder
Shroder
Schroders